Geopsammodius is a genus of aphodiine dung beetles in the family Scarabaeidae. There are about 9 described species in Geopsammodius.

Species
 Geopsammodius fuscus Skelley, 2006
 Geopsammodius hydropicus (Horn, 1887) (Atlantic dune tiny sand-loving scarab)
 Geopsammodius morrisi Skelley, 2006
 Geopsammodius ohoopee Skelley, 2006
 Geopsammodius relictillus (Deyrup & Woodruff, 1991) (relictual tiny sand-loving scarab)
 Geopsammodius rileyi Skelley, 2006
 Geopsammodius subpedalis Skelley, 2006 (underfoot tiny sand-loving scarab)
 Geopsammodius unsidensis Skelley, 2006
 Geopsammodius withlacoochee Skelley, 2006

References

Further reading

 
 
 

Scarabaeidae